Francisco is the innermost  irregular satellite of Uranus.

Francisco was discovered by Matthew J. Holman, et al. and Brett J. Gladman, et al. in 2003 from pictures taken in 2001 and given the provisional designation S/2001 U 3.
Confirmed as Uranus XXII, it was named after a lord in William Shakespeare's play The Tempest.

See also 

 Uranus' natural satellites

References

External links 
 Francisco profile by NASA's Solar System Exploration
 David Jewitt pages
  Uranus' Known Satellites (by Scott S. Sheppard)
 Ephemeris IAU-NSES

Moons of Uranus
Irregular satellites
 
20010813
Moons with a retrograde orbit